Jean-Paul van Poppel (born 30 September 1962 in Tilburg, North Brabant) is a former Dutch racing cyclist, who was nicknamed Popeye.

Van Poppel was one of the most successful Dutch road sprinters. He won stages in mass sprints in all three Grand Tours, sometimes from positions that appeared lost. In the Tour de France he won 9 stages altogether. In 1988 he won 4 stages, the highest won number by a Dutch cyclist in one tour. He also competed in the individual road race event at the 1984 Summer Olympics.

Van Poppel won the points classification in the 1987 Tour de France. After he ended his career in 1995, he became a directeur sportif in women's cycling. With his first wife, cyclist Leontine van der Lienden, Jean-Paul van Poppel has two sons, Boy van Poppel and Danny van Poppel, who both currently ride for UCI WorldTeam ., and a daughter Kim. Van der Lienden and Van Poppel have since divorced. Van Poppel remarried in 2004 with one of his team members, cyclist Mirjam Melchers.

From 2009 to 2010 he was one of the Sports Directors at the Cervélo Test Team based in Switzerland. From 2011, he has served as a Sports Director for the  until 2014. From 2015 till the team folded in 2019, van Poppel serves as a Sports Director for the Dutch ProContinental Team , together with Erik Breukink and Michael Boogerd.

Major results
Source:

1985
 1st Stage 7 Danmark Rundt
 1st Stage 5 Tour de l'Avenir
 1st Stage 3a Tour of Belgium
1986
 1st Scheldeprijs
 Giro d'Italia
1st Stages 2 & 13
 1st Stage 4 Tirreno–Adriatico
1987
 Tour de France
1st  Points classification
1st Stages 8 & 17
 Tour of Sweden
1st Stages 5, 6a & 7
1988
 1st Scheldeprijs
 Tour de France
1st Stages 3, 10, 17 & 22
1989
 Giro d'Italia
1st Stages 1 & 15
 1st Veenendaal–Veenendaal
1991
 Vuelta a España
1st Stages 6, 9, 13 & 21
 1st Stage 7 Tour de France
 1st Stage 5 Paris–Nice
1992
 Vuelta a España
1st Stages 3 & 5
 1st Stage 10 Tour de France
1993
 Vuelta a España
1st Stages 4 & 8
1994
 1st  Overall Étoile de Bessèges
 1st Stage 2 Tour de France
 1st Stage 9 Vuelta a España

See also
 List of Dutch Olympic cyclists

References

1962 births
Living people
Dutch male cyclists
Dutch Tour de France stage winners
Tour de France Champs Elysées stage winners
Dutch Vuelta a España stage winners
Cyclists at the 1984 Summer Olympics
Olympic cyclists of the Netherlands
Sportspeople from Tilburg
Dutch Giro d'Italia stage winners
Cyclists from North Brabant